Buly Arena is an ice hockey arena in Kravaře in the Czech Republic. The stadium was opened in 2003. It has a capacity of 640 seats and was built for the training of teams, including the Czech national ice hockey team.

Buly Arena is also a sport and relaxation centre. It offers a tennis hall, outdoor tennis courts and football pitch.

There are plans to build an aquapark next to Buly Arena.

External links

Indoor arenas in the Czech Republic
Indoor ice hockey venues in the Czech Republic
2003 establishments in the Czech Republic
Opava District
Sports venues completed in 2003
21st-century architecture in the Czech Republic